Sørvágur Municipality, is the westernmost municipality in the Faroe Islands.

It consists of the villages of Sørvágur, Bøur, Gásadalur and Mykines. Originally the municipality only included the village of Sørvágur, but in January 2005 the municipality of Sørvágur agreed to merge with the smaller municipalities of Bøur/Gásadal and Mykines.

The new municipality had a population of 1,236 in 2020.

Logo
The logo of the municipality is two white birds on a white/blue background with an orange sundisk. The two birds are made in the image of the letters S and K which are the initials for Sørvágs Kommuna.

Gallery

References

External links
Sorvag.fo Webpage for the municipality of Sørvágur

Sørvágur
Municipalities of the Faroe Islands